Aratlakatta is a village in Karapa mandal, located in East Godavari district Indian state of Andhra Pradesh.

References 

Villages in East Godavari district